Hiruni Wijayaratne (born December 5, 1990) is a Sri Lankan-American track and field athlete, specializing in long distance running events. She is considered the most decorated Sri Lankan distance athlete, as she holds eleven Sri Lankan national records for road and track events as of 2019. These include the women's 10,000 metres and marathon.

She first ran the Sri Lankan women's marathon record of 2:36:35 in Houston, Texas, USA during the 2018 Chevron Houston Marathon. She then renewed the Sri Lankan women's marathon record at the 2019 Düsseldorf Marathon, with a time of 2:34:10 which is also a South Asian Area Record.

Hiruni represented Sri Lanka in the 2017 London marathon at the 2017 World Championships in Athletics.  In 2019, she competed in the women's marathon at the 2019 World Athletics Championships held in Doha, Qatar. She did not finish her race. She was discarded from selection for the 2022 Commonwealth Games by National Sports Selection Committee despite recommendation by Wimalasena Perera.

Outside of running, Hiruni works in Customer Success for Omada Health.

Competition record

References

External links 

Hiruni Wijayaratne Kentucky Wildcats results

1990 births
Living people
World Athletics Championships athletes for Sri Lanka
Sri Lankan female marathon runners
University of Kentucky alumni
Sportspeople from Virginia
People from Virginia
Athletes (track and field) at the 2018 Commonwealth Games
Athletes (track and field) at the 2018 Asian Games
Sri Lankan emigrants to the United States
Asian Games competitors for Sri Lanka
South Asian Games gold medalists for Sri Lanka
South Asian Games medalists in athletics
Asian sportspeople
Commonwealth Games competitors for Sri Lanka